Virgilio Tommasi (10 May 1905 - 20 February 1998) was an Italian long jumper who competed at the 1924 Summer Olympics. He was the brother of the other Olympic athlete Angelo Tommasi.

National titles
He won six times the national championships at senior level.

Italian Athletics Championships
Long jump: 1924, 1925, 1926, 1928, 1929, 1931 (6)

See also
 Men's long jump Italian record progression

References

External links
 

1905 births
1998 deaths
Athletes (track and field) at the 1924 Summer Olympics
Athletes (track and field) at the 1928 Summer Olympics
Italian male long jumpers
Olympic athletes of Italy